Banded Peak is a small peak which rises over  in the Duncan Mountains of Antarctica. It was named by the Southern Party of the New Zealand Geological Survey Antarctic Expedition, 1963–64.

References 

Mountains of the Ross Dependency
Amundsen Coast